Max Cohen-Olivar (30 April 1945 – 21 May 2018) was a Moroccan racing driver. He is considered to be one of the greatest Moroccan racing drivers of all time. He competed extensively in the prestigious 24 Hours of Le Mans race, and at the time of his final appearance in 2001 he was only the ninth driver to start the race 20 or more times. The others were Henri Pescarolo, Bob Wollek, Yojiro Terada, Derek Bell, François Migault, Claude Ballot-Léna, Claude Haldi and Pierre Yver.

Le Mans

His first appearance in the race was in 1971, when he partnered André Wicky in the Swiss driver's own Porsche 908. The gearbox failed in the twentieth hour, with the pair in 10th place in the race and second in their class. The Wicky car failed to start the race the following year, but they had better luck in 1973 as they were joined by the Swiss driver Philippe Carron. The trio were the slowest of all the finishers, 21st on the road and 9th in class. For 1974 Wicky ran a De Tomaso Pantera for Cohen-Olivar and Carron, but the duo retired in the fourth hour of the race. In 1975 Cohen-Olivar drove the lead Wicky Porsche, alongside Carron and Frenchman Joël Brachet. They were uncompetitive again, before the clutch failed in the seventeenth hour, causing Cohen-Olivar's third retirement in four Le Mans entries.

Wicky entered a De Tomaso Pantera for Cohen-Olivar, Jacques Marché and Martial Delalande for the 1976 race but the trio did not start the race. In 1977 Cohen-Olivar joined the French ROC (Racing Organisation Course) entry, driving a Chevron B36 alongside Alain Flotard and Michel Dubois. The car once again failed to make the finish, dropping out in the eighteenth hour. ROC ran two B36s in 1978, and while the other car managed to win the S 2.0 class, the car Cohen-Olivar shared with Frenchmen Jacques Henry and Albert Dufrene suffered a similar fate to the previous year, again retiring in the eighteenth hour, this time with an engine failure.

For 1979 24 Hours of Le Mans, Cohen-Olivar joined up with a new French entry under the Lambretta banner, sharing a Lola T298 with Pierre Yver and Michel Elkoubi. This combination gave Cohen-Olivar his first finish since 1973, and even some silverware, as they finished 21st overall and third in the S 2.0 class.

Despite this success, the team did not enter the race again, and it wasn't until 1981 that Cohen-Olivar was able to race at Le Mans again. He again raced a T298, this time owned by Frenchman Jean-Marie Lemerle. The car was co-piloted by Lemerle and his fellow Frenchman Alain Levié. Another uncompetitive race for Cohen-Olivar ended in the seventeenth hour when the car's electrics failed. He remained with Lemerle in 1982, who with support from Italian firm Sivama Motor was able to run a new car, a Lancia Beta Monte Carlo. Levié was replaced in the team by American Joe Castellano, and the trio had much better luck than the previous year, with 12th overall and second in class. This 12th place would remain Cohen-Olivar's best ever result in the race.

Racing record

Complete World Sportscar Championship results
(key) (Races in bold indicate pole position) (Races in italics indicate fastest lap)

Footnotes

24 Hours of Le Mans results

References

External links
 

1945 births
2018 deaths
Moroccan racing drivers
24 Hours of Le Mans drivers
World Sportscar Championship drivers
People from Casablanca